Guillermo Chirichigno (25 June 1902 – 3 June 1970) was a Peruvian athlete. He competed in the men's pole vault at the 1936 Summer Olympics, finishing 29th. He won a gold medal at the South American Championships in Athletics in 1935, and silver in the inaugural 1938 Bolivarian Games.

References

External links
 

1902 births
1970 deaths
Athletes (track and field) at the 1936 Summer Olympics
Peruvian male pole vaulters
Olympic athletes of Peru
Place of birth missing